Chenaran Rural District is a rural district (dehestan) in the Central District of Chenaran County, Razavi Khorasan Province, Iran. At the 2006 census, its population was 17,109, in 4,261 families.  The rural district has 66 villages.

References 

Rural Districts of Razavi Khorasan Province
Chenaran County